ATM or atm often refers to:

 Atmosphere (unit) or atm, a unit of atmospheric pressure
 Automated teller machine, a cash dispenser or cash machine

ATM or atm may also refer to:

Computing 
 ATM (computer), a ZX Spectrum clone developed in Moscow in 1991
 Adobe Type Manager, a computer program for managing fonts
 Accelerated Turing machine, or Zeno machine, a model of computation used in theoretical computer science
 Alternating Turing machine, a model of computation used in theoretical computer science
 Asynchronous Transfer Mode, a telecommunications protocol used in networking
 ATM adaptation layer
 ATM Adaptation Layer 5

Media 
 Amateur Telescope Making, a series of books by Albert Graham Ingalls
 ATM (2012 film), an American film
 ATM: Er Rak Error, a 2012 Thai film
 Azhagiya Tamil Magan, a 2007 Indian film
 "ATM" (song), a 2018 song by J. Cole from KOD

People and organizations 
 Abiding Truth Ministries, anti-LGBT organization in Springfield, Massachusetts, US
 Association of Teachers of Mathematics, UK 
 Acrylic Tank Manufacturing, US aquarium manufacturer, televised in Tanked
 ATM FA, a football club in Malaysia
 Alfred Thayer Mahan (1840 - 1914), American US Naval officer and historian.
 A. T. M. Wilson (1906–1978), British psychiatrist
African Transformation Movement, South African political party founded in 2018
The a2 Milk Company (NZX ticker symbol ATM)

Science 
 Apollo Telescope Mount, a solar observatory
 ATM serine/threonine kinase, a serine/threonine kinase activated by DNA damage
 The Airborne Topographic Mapper, a laser altimeter among the instruments used by NASA's Operation IceBridge

Transportation 
 Active traffic management, a motorway scheme on the M42 in England
 Air traffic management, a concept in aviation
 Altamira Airport, in Brazil (IATA code ATM)
 Azienda Trasporti Milanesi, the municipal public transport company of Milan
 Airlines of Tasmania (ICAO code ATM)

Catalonia, Spain 
 Autoritat del Transport Metropolità (ATM Àrea de Barcelona), in the Barcelona metropolitan area
 Autoritat Territorial de la Mobilitat del Camp de Tarragona (ATM Camp de Tarragona), in the Camp de Tarragona area
 Autoritat Territorial de la Mobilitat de l'Àrea de Girona (ATM Àrea de Girona), in the Girona area
 Autoritat Territorial de la Mobilitat de l'Àrea de Lleida (ATM Àrea de Lleida), in the Lleida area

Other uses 
 Actun Tunichil Muknal, a cave in Belize
 Anti-tank missile, a missile designed to destroy tanks
 Ass to mouth, a sexual act
 At the money, moneyness where the strike price is the same as the current spot price
 At-the-market offering, a type of follow-on offering of stock
 Automatenmarken, a variable value stamp
Contracted form of Atlético Madrid, football club in Spain
Common abbreviation in SMS language for "at the moment"